The Iron Bride (German: Die eiserne Braut) is a 1925 German silent film directed by Carl Boese and starring Otto Gebühr, Claire Rommer and Maly Delschaft.

The film's sets were designed by the art director Karl Machus.

Cast
 Otto Gebühr
 Claire Rommer
 Maly Delschaft
 Owen Gorin
 Erna Morena
 Werner Pittschau
 Ernst Dernburg
 Otto Reinwald
 Carl Zickner
 Senta Eichstaedt
 Leopold von Ledebur
 Clementine Plessner

References

Bibliography
 Bock, Hans-Michael & Bergfelder, Tim. The Concise CineGraph. Encyclopedia of German Cinema. Berghahn Books, 2009.

External links

1925 films
Films of the Weimar Republic
Films directed by Carl Boese
German silent feature films
German black-and-white films
National Film films